R. Nagarathnamma (1926–2012) was an Indian theatre personality and the founder of Stree Nataka Mandali, an all-women theatre group based in Bengaluru. A recipient of the Sangeet Natak Akademi Award, she was honored by the Government of India, in 2012, with the fourth highest Indian civilian award of Padma Shri.

Biography
Nagarathnamma was born in 1926 in a family with moderate financial means, in Mysore, in the South Indian state of Karnataka. She started working in professional theatre at the age of 12, working with such troupes as Sri Chamundeshwari Nataka Sabha, Gubbi Company run by Gubbi Veeranna, Mitra Mandali of Hirannaiah and HLN Simha. Later, in 1958, Nagarathnamma established Stree Nataka Mandali, reported to be the first all-women theatre troupe from Karnataka where she performed as an actor and was the director of their plays.

Nagarathnamma is known for her depiction of male characters, especially mythological ones. She is credited with notable performances as Kamsa, Krishna, Ravana, Duryodhana and Bheema. She has travelled in many other states in India with her troupe and Krishna Garudi is stated to be one of her major plays. She has also acted in 15 Kannada and Tamil films, Kamanabillu, Parasangada Gendethimma and Rosapoo Ravikkaikari being some of the notable ones.

Nagarathnamma died on 6 October 2012, at the age of 87, after a brief period of illness.

Awards and recognitions
Nagarathnamma was a recipient of many awards such as Tagore Ratna Award and Gubbi Veeranna Award. She has been honored by the Government of Karnataka with their second highest civilian award of Rajyotsava Prashasti. She received the Sangeet Natak Akademi Award in 1992. In 2012, the Government of India included her in the Republic Day honours list for the fourth highest Indian civilian award of Padma Shri. She is also conferred Sangeet Natak Akademi Tagore Ratna in 2012 as special awards to commemorate 150th Birth Anniversary of Rabindranath Tagore.

See also

 Gubbi Veeranna

References

Further reading

External links
 

1926 births
2012 deaths
Recipients of the Padma Shri in arts
Recipients of the Sangeet Natak Akademi Award
Businesswomen from Karnataka
Indian theatre directors
Indian theatre managers and producers
Actresses in Tamil cinema
Actresses in Kannada cinema
Indian film actresses
Indian women theatre directors
Actresses from Mysore
Businesspeople from Mysore
20th-century Indian businesspeople
20th-century Indian actresses
20th-century Indian businesswomen
Indian stage actresses
Actresses in Kannada theatre